Ellen Letty Aronson (née Konigsberg; born November 30, 1943) is an American film producer and is the younger sister of writer and director Woody Allen.

Personal life
Aronson was born Ellen Letty Konigsberg in 1943 in New York City, to Nettie (née Cherry) and Martin Königsberg, and was raised in Midwood, Brooklyn, New York. Her older brother is writer and director Woody Allen. Aronson comes from a Jewish family; her grandparents were from Lithuania and Austria. She was educated at Brooklyn College and New York University. Aronson was married to Sidney Aronson, an elementary school principal in Brooklyn who died in 2002. They had three children together, Christopher, Erika, and Alexa.

Career
She has produced many of her brother Woody Allen's films including Bullets over Broadway (1994), Mighty Aphrodite (1995), Deconstructing Harry (1997), Celebrity (1998), The Curse of the Jade Scorpion (2001), Anything Else (2003), Melinda and Melinda (2004), Match Point (2005), Scoop (2006), Cassandra's Dream (2007), Vicky Cristina Barcelona (2008), Whatever Works (2009), You Will Meet a Tall Dark Stranger (2010), Midnight in Paris (2011), To Rome with Love (2012), and Blue Jasmine (2013).

Filmography

As a producer

Awards and nominations

References

Further reading 
 Kaufman, Anthony, "Aronson: Stoking Woody's annual output", Variety, September 22, 2011

External links

1943 births
Living people
American film producers
American people of Austrian-Jewish descent
American people of Russian-Jewish descent
Golden Globe Award-winning producers
Businesspeople from New York City
American women film producers
People from Midwood, Brooklyn
20th-century American businesspeople
20th-century American businesswomen
21st-century American businesspeople
Brooklyn College alumni
21st-century American businesswomen